The year 1848 in science and technology involved some significant events, listed below.

Events
 September 20 – The American Association for the Advancement of Science is set up in Pennsylvania by re-formation of the Association of American Geologists and Naturalists, with William Charles Redfield as its first president.

Astronomy
 September 16 – William Cranch Bond and William Lassell discover Hyperion, Saturn's moon.
 Lord Rosse studies M1 and names it the Crab Nebula.
 Édouard Roche calculates the Roche limit.
 Rudolf Wolf (in Zurich) devises a way of quantifying sunspot activity, the Wolf number.

Botany
 April 16 – Joseph Dalton Hooker arrives at Darjeeling to begin the first European plant collecting expedition in the Himalayas.

Chemistry
 Edward Frankland, working in Germany, discovers the organometallic compound diethylzinc.

Exploration
 Admiral Nevelskoi demonstrates that the Strait of Tartary is a strait.

Medicine
 September 13 – Vermont railroad worker Phineas Gage survives a 3-foot-plus (1 m) iron rod being driven through his head, providing a demonstration of the effects of damage to the brain's frontal lobe.
 November 1 – The first medical school for women, The Boston Female Medical School, opens in Boston, Massachusetts.
 Alfred Baring Garrod recognises that excess uric acid in the blood is the cause of gout.
 Rudolf Virchow produces a Report on the Typhus Epidemic in Upper Silesia advocating broad social as well as public health measures to counter such outbreaks.

Physics
 Lord Kelvin establishes concept of absolute zero, the temperature at which all molecular motion ceases.
 Nicholas Callan of Maynooth College invents an improved form of battery.
 Hippolyte Fizeau and John Scott Russell present studies of the Doppler effect in electromagnetic and sound waves respectively.

Technology
 August 15 – James Warren submits a U.K. patent application for the Warren truss.
 James Bogardus erects the first free-standing cast-iron architectural façade, the Milhau Pharmacy Building in New York City.
 French civil engineer A. Boucher promotes the ribbed ("false") skew arch.
 Completion of palm houses at Kew Gardens, London, and the National Botanic Gardens, Glasnevin, by Richard Turner of Dublin.
 Joseph-Louis Lambot constructs the first ferrocement boat, in France.
 Linus Yale Sr., invents the modern pin tumbler lock.
 John Stringfellow flies a steam-powered monoplane model for a short distance in a powered glide in England.

Awards
 Copley Medal: John Couch Adams
 Wollaston Medal for Geology: William Buckland

Births
 March 8 – LaMarcus Adna Thompson (died 1919), American inventor.
 April 9 – Sebastian Ziani de Ferranti (died 1930), British-born electrical engineer and inventor
 May 23 – Otto Lilienthal (died 1896), German aviation pioneer.
 June 12 – Albertina Carlsson (died 1930) Swedish zoologist.
 June 22 – William Macewen (died 1924), Scottish surgeon.
 July 7 – Cuthbert Hilton Golding-Bird (died 1939), English surgeon.
 August 14 – Margaret Lindsay (died 1915), Irish astronomer.
 November 1 – Caroline Still Anderson (died 1919), African American physician, educator and activist.
 November 8 – Gottlob Frege (died 1925), German mathematician.
 November 27 – Henry A. Rowland (died 1901), American physicist.

Deaths
 January 9 – Caroline Herschel (born 1750), German astronomer.
 January 12 – Christophe-Paulin de La Poix de Fréminville (born 1787), French explorer and naturalist.
 January 24 – Horace Wells, American dentist, pioneer of the use of anesthesia, suicide (born 1815).
 August 7 – Jöns Jakob Berzelius (born 1779), Swedish chemist.
 August 12 – George Stephenson (born 1781), English locomotive engineer.
 December 18 – Bernard Bolzano (born 1781), Bohemian mathematician.

References

 
19th century in science
1840s in science